Midnattens Widunder is the debut studio album by Finnish folk metal band Finntroll. It was released in Finland in 1999 by Spinefarm.

Concept
The lyrical content of the album follows the story of the legendary  Rivfader ("Rip-father"), "king-shaman" of the trollish race, and his war against Christian encroachment of the trollish "North Lands". The trolls gather under the Svartberg ("Black Mountain") around the ancient throne of Rivfader, who then leads them on a war against the "Tribe of Christ".
The story acts as an analogy of the conflict between Christians and Pagans in Early Medieval Scandinavia, and many of the concepts appearing in the album are returned to in the band's later work. The character of the Troll-King Rivfader, in particular, is a recurring figure, again taking centre-stage for the band's fourth album, Ur Jordens Djup.

Track listing

Tracks 1 and 9 music by Trollhorn.
Track 2 lyrics by Katla, music by Trollhorn.
Tracks 3, 4 and 6-8 lyrics by Katla, music by Somnium.
Track 5 lyrics by Katla, music by Somnium/Trollhorn.

Personnel
Jan "Katla" Jämsen – vocals
Samuli "Skrymer" Ponsimaa (credited as "Örmy") – guitar
Teemu "Somnium" Raimoranta – guitar
Samu "Beast Dominator" Ruotsalainen – drums
Henri "Trollhorn" Sorvali – keyboards
Sami "Tundra" Uusitalo – bass

Additional personnel
Tapio Wilska – clean vocals on "Vätteanda" and "Midnattens widunder"
Mistress Helga – accordion on "Midnattens widunder"

References

External links 
 Midnattens widunder at AllMusic

1999 debut albums
Concept albums
Finntroll albums
Season of Mist albums